Belgium competed at the 1994 Winter Olympics in Lillehammer, Norway.

Competitors
The following is the list of number of competitors in the Games.

Results by event

Alpine skiing 

Women

Short track speed skating

Men

Women

References

Sources
Official Olympic Reports

Nations at the 1994 Winter Olympics
1994
Olympic